Makasae (also known as Makassai, Macassai, Ma'asae, Makasai) is a Papuan language spoken by about 100,000 people in the eastern part of East Timor, in the districts of Baucau and Viqueque, just to the west of Fataluku. It is the most widely spoken Papuan language west of New Guinea.

Phonology

The data in this section are from Huber (2017).

Consonants

Native consonant phonemes are shown in the chart below for the Ossu dialect. Borrowed consonants are enclosed in parenthesis.

Vowels

Monophthongs
Makasae has five vowel phonemes.

References

Further reading
 Huber, Juliette (2008). First steps towards a grammar of Makasae: a language of East Timor. LINCOM

External links
 Makasai at The Language Archive

Oirata–Makasai languages
Languages of East Timor